West Virginia Route 93 is an east–west state highway located in the Eastern Panhandle of West Virginia. WV 93 runs from U.S. Route 48 and West Virginia Route 32 in Davis in Tucker County to U.S. Route 220 near Keyser in Mineral County.

Route description

The western terminus of the route is at West Virginia Route 32 in Davis, Tucker County. WV 93 passes by the Mount Storm Lake near Mount Storm. WV 93 then runs concurrent with West Virginia Route 42 upon descending the Allegheny Front. Under the current plans for Corridor H, WV 93 would be directly upgraded to a four-lane divided highway between Davis (WV 32) and Bismarck (west of WV 42). Until July 2017, the eastern terminus was at U.S. Route 50 southwest of Claysville, Mineral County.

In July 2017, WV 972 was decommissioned and WV 93 was extended east along US 50 to meet it.  The extension brings WV 93 eastward, concurrent with US 50 from its former eastern terminus to the former WV 972 near New Creek. From there, WV 93 follows the former route of WV 972 through New Creek before terminating at an intersection with US 220 (Cut-Off Road).

Attractions

Historical sites
Claysville Church
Log House of Claysville

Major intersections

References

093
Transportation in Grant County, West Virginia
Transportation in Mineral County, West Virginia
Transportation in Tucker County, West Virginia